St James, Didsbury, on Stenner Lane, is a Grade II* Church of England church in the Manchester suburb of Didsbury and with Emmanuel church is part of the parish of St James and Emmanuel, Didsbury.

History

In 1235, Albertus de Gresley granted land to Nicholas de Longford, Lord of the Manor of Withington, for the foundation of his own chapel in Didsbury.  The first mention of the chapel is in the records of the Lancashire Assizes when 'William, Chaplain of Didsbury, came not on the first day and was fined'.

In 1352, the Bishop of Lichfield gave permission for the consecration of a churchyard for the burial of the victims of the Black Death.

In 1541, the Diocese of Chester was formed and the church was transferred from the Diocese of Lichfield.  The parish covered an area from the River Mersey to Moss Side and from Chorlton-cum-Hardy to Heaton Norris and Reddish.

In accordance with the orders of Elizabeth I all records of births, deaths and marriages began to be recorded in 1561.  The original register is in the City of Manchester archives and includes the record of the baptism of Saint Ambrose Barlow on 30 November 1585.

Architecture and setting

St James is an ancient Anglican church of medieval origins with significant subsequent 17th and mid-19th century modifications.  The church was designated a Grade II* listed building on 25 February 1952.

The original chapel is believed to have been a 13th-century oratory.  Rebuilding, including the "dumpy" tower, took place in the early 17th century.  A memorial stone over the tower's north door commemorates its benefactors, Sir Edward Moseley and Anne Mosley and the date 1620. The pinnacles and loops surmounting the tower are from 1801.  The Mosley family, local magnates, were the benefactors. The chapel became the parish church of Didsbury in 1850.  The nave was constructed in 1855, the chancel in 1871 and the east part of the south aisle in 1895.  The church is of red sandstone with slate roofs.

Pevsner found the interior "odd, [with] early seventeenth century fabric, but later additions and alterations [have] changed its character". The 18th-centuries galleries have been removed and substantial reconstruction took place in the 1850s and 1890s.  The stained glass is all 19th century. The church contains impressive funerary monuments, particularly of the Mosley family.  A "good early C17 wall monument in Renaissance style ... a 3-bay Ionic colonnade surmounted by a central Corinthian architrave with cresting, with kneeling figures in each part" commemorates Ralph Mosley, who died in 1616. Sir Nicholas Mosley, the builder of Hough End Hall, is shown kneeling, "dressed in the robes of the Lord Mayor of London (1599)".  The Mosley heiress, Ann, Lady Bland, the founder of St Ann's Church, Manchester, is also represented.

The interior of the church underwent significant repair and renovation in 2012 as part of the 775th anniversary celebrations.

Bell tower

The six St James’ bells date from 1727 and were cast in Gloucester. The bells are rung before worship on Sunday and for weddings and special occasions.

See also

Grade II* listed buildings in Greater Manchester
Listed buildings in Manchester-M20

References
Notes

Bibliography

External links
 Official website
 Didsbury Bell Ringers

Churches in Manchester
Church of England church buildings in Greater Manchester
Grade II* listed churches in Manchester